Hayyim ben Joseph Vital (Safed, October 23, 1542 (Julian calendar) and October 11, 1542 (Gregorian Calendar) – Damascus, 23 April 1620) was a rabbi in Safed and the foremost disciple of Isaac Luria. He recorded much of his master's teachings. After Vital's death, his writings began to spread and led to a "powerful impact on various circles throughout the Jewish world."

Early life

Born in Safed, as a young boy Hayyim Vital was educated by the scholar Moshe Alshich. Joseph Karo is said to have paid special attention to Vital's early talents and in 1557 requested that Alshich take special care in his education as he was destined to succeed his teacher in the world of Torah study. That same year, Vital first became acquainted with the kabbalist Isaac Luria, who would have a lasting influence on him.

Vital apparently married at a young age. It was an unhappy marriage, and when he left his wife, the prophet Elijah appeared to him in a dream and led him to a beautiful garden, where he saw the pious of all ages, in the form of birds, flying through the garden and studying the Mishnah. In the center of the garden was God seated on a throne that was surrounded by the pious, resting on elaborate tapestries. Convinced by this vision that he was destined to become a kabbalist, Vital devoted the following two and a half years to the study of alchemy. Upon completing his studies, Elijah appeared to him again in a vision and told him that he would succeed in his efforts and write a commentary on the Zohar.

Study with Cordovero

When Luria arrived in Safed, Rabbi Moses ben Jacob Cordovero had been the principal figure in the kabbalistic community for numerous years. "Cordovero was the teacher of what appears to have been a relatively loose knit circle of disciples. The most important were Elijah de Vidas, Abraham Galante, Moses Galante, Hayyim Vital, Abraham ben Eliezer ha-Levi Berukhim, Elazar ben Moshe Azikri, Samuel Gallico, and an important kabbalist who studied with Cordovero for a short while in the 1560s, Mordechai Dato."

There's evidence to suggest that Isaac Luria also regarded Moses Cordovero as his teacher. Joseph Sambari (1640-1703), an Egyptian chronicler, testified that Cordovero was 'the Ari's teacher for a very short time.' Luria probably arrived in early 1570, and Cordovero died on June 27 that year (the 23d day of Tammuz). Bereft of their most prominent authority and teacher, the kabbalists looked for new guidance, and Isaac Luria helped fill the vacuum left by Cordovero's passing.

Student of Isaac Luria

In 1570 Vital became a student of Isaac Luria, the foremost kabbalist of the day. In a study of Lurianic mysticism, Lawrence Fine writes:
Vital provides us with the names of 38 individuals who according to him, made up Luria's discipleship... According to him, the fellowship was divided into four hierarchically ordered groups. The first and most important, was composed of 11 men, listed in this order: Hayyim Vital, Jonathan Sagis, Joseph Arzin, Isaac Kohen, Gedaliah ha-Levi, Samuel Uceda, Judah Mishan, Abraham Gavriel, Shabbatai Menashe, Joseph ibn Tabul, and Elijah Falko (or Falkon). 
It is largely accepted that within a year Hayyim Vital emerged as the leading student, so that when the Arizal died in 1572, at the age of 38, Vital succeeded him. Since the Arizal had left almost none of his teachings in writing, Vital began to write down everything he had learned from his master.

Exile and return

Hayyim Vital arrived in Egypt in 1577, but soon returned to Ottoman Syria, settling in the village of Ein Zeitim (near Safed), and later in Jerusalem. After that he went to live in Damascus, where he became the head of the Sicilian Jewish community

In Damascus he began writing his first work of his own. The greater part of the book consists of an exposition on the conjuring of clouds and a discourse on the seven wandering stars (planets), the Seven Heavens, and their corresponding metals. Upon completing his book, Vital returned to Jerusalem, where his former teacher, Moshe Alshich, ordained him "in the 1590s." After a time, however, Vital left Jerusalem for Safed, where he fell sick and was bedridden for an entire year.

He also authored Shaar HaGilgulim, a kabbalistic work on reincarnation, which became one of the Shemonah She'arim (see below).

Etz Hayyim

During this illness Rabbi Yehoshua, his closest follower, who had accompanied Vital on nearly every journey, and managed to bribe Vital's younger brother, Rabbi Moshe, with 500 gold coins to lend him  Vital's writings, which were kept locked in a box. Rabbi Moshe accordingly brought Yehoshua a large part of the manuscripts, and 100 copyists were immediately engaged: in just three days, they were able to reproduce more than 600 pages. Although according to some reports Vital, upon learning of this, claimed that the papers which has been copied were not his own writings, they were rapidly disseminated. The writings in question purported to contain the teachings of the Luria rather than Vital's independent work.

The first printed edition was in eight volumes, known as the Shemonah She'arim, and this version is still used by some Kabbalists in the Sephardi world. The best known recension was published later under the title Etz Hayyim ("Tree of Life"), in which the topics were arranged in a more systematic order, and the parts on ritual (the Peri Etz Hayyim) were kept separate from the parts on the underlying theology. In addition to a tribute to the Luria, the work contains the assertion that it is one of God's greatest pleasures to witness the promotion of the teaching of the Kabbalah, since this alone can assure the coming of the Jewish Messiah.

However, Vital still held the teachings of his former teacher, kabbalist Moses Cordovero, in high esteem. He maintained that Cordovero often appeared to him in dreams.

One of the most prominent of Vital's opponents was Menahem Lonzano, who publicly denounced him in his work Imrei Emet.

Later life and death

On 20 Elul 1590, Vital received rabbinical ordination from his teacher Moshe Alshich. Four years later, in 1594, he settled permanently in Damascus, where he lectured every evening on the kabbalah. In 1604 Vital's sight began to fail; in 1620 he died while preparing to return to Safed. He was 77.

Notes

References
 
 
Hayyim ben Joseph Vital, The Tree of Life: Chayyim Vital's Introduction to the Kabbalah of Isaac Luria - The Palace of Adam Kadmon. Translated and with an introduction by Donald Wilder Menzi and Zwe Padeh. Northvale, N.J. and Jerusalem: Jason Aronson, 1999. This is a translation of the first volume of Luria's “Etz Chaim”; the introduction by the translators gives a general overview of the Lurianic system.

External links 

 Shaarei Kedushah - Gates of Holiness in English
 Works of Rabbi Chaim Vital
 Introduction by Chaim Vital (Hebrew)
 Sefer Gilgulim
 Great Leaders of our People - Rabbi Chaim Vital
 Encyclopædia Britannica articles

1542 births
1620 deaths
16th-century rabbis from the Ottoman Empire
17th-century rabbis from the Ottoman Empire
Jewish mysticism
Kabbalists
Isaac Luria
Rabbis in Safed
Rabbis in Ottoman Galilee
Sephardi rabbis in Ottoman Palestine